Caradrina beta is a species of cutworm or dart moth in the family Noctuidae first described by William Barnes and Foster Hendrickson Benjamin in 1926. It is found in North America.

The MONA or Hodges number for Caradrina beta is 9655.1.

References

Further reading

 
 
 

Caradrinini
Articles created by Qbugbot
Moths described in 1926